The General Consumer Council for Northern Ireland (GCCNI) was created by the Government in 1985 and is funded by the Department for the Economy (DfE).  The body aims to represent consumers' interests.

It is designated by the Secretary of State as being able to bring a super-complaint to the OFT:

References

Northern Ireland Executive
1985 establishments in Northern Ireland
Organizations established in 1985